Pavangal Pennungal is a 1973 Indian Malayalam-language film, directed and produced by Kunchacko. The film stars Prem Nazir, Vijayasree, Adoor Bhasi, K. P. Ummer and N. Govindankutty. The film had musical score by G. Devarajan. This was Prem Nazir's 300th film and was an average hit.

Cast
Prem Nazir
Vijayasree
Ushakumari
Adoor Bhasi
K. P. Ummer
N. Govindankutty
S. P. Pillai

Soundtrack
The music was composed by G. Devarajan with lyrics by Vayalar Ramavarma.

References

External links
 

1973 films
1970s Malayalam-language films